Lorenzo Cybo de Mari  (c. 1450/1451 – 21 December 1503) was an Italian Catholic cardinal. He was archbishop of Benevento.

Biography
Born in Genoa, de Mari was an illegitimate child. According to some sources his paternity was attributed to Domenico de Mari, patrician of Genoa, brother of Teodorina and uncle of Maurizio Cybo, although another source states Maurizio (d. April 1491) was his father.

He was made cardinal on 9 March 1489 by his uncle, pope Innocent VIII. He built the first Cybo Chapel in the Basilica of Santa Maria del Popolo in the beginning of the 16th century which was decorated by the frescos of Pinturicchio and the works of Andrea Bregno but was destroyed by Alderano Cybo in 1682-87.

He also was bishop of Vannes in France, bishop of Palestrina (1493), bishop of Albano (1501) and bishop of Noli (1502).

References

Sources

1450s births
1503 deaths
15th-century Genoese people
15th-century Roman Catholic archbishops in the Kingdom of Naples
16th-century Roman Catholic archbishops in the Kingdom of Naples
16th-century Italian cardinals
15th-century Italian cardinals
Cardinal-bishops of Albano
Cardinal-bishops of Frascati
Cardinal-bishops of Palestrina
Archbishops of Benevento
Bishops of Noli
Bishops of Vannes
Cardinal-nephews